Sumanth C. Raman is a Tamil television anchor and sports commentator. He was the host of BSNL Sports Quiz on Doordarshan's Podhigai TV channel. On September 17, 2017, BSNL Sports Quiz celebrated its 800th episode, continuing to be India's longest running quiz program.

Education

Dr Raman holds a Diploma in Child Health and an MD in General Medicine. He also holds a Diploma in Computer Applications.

Career
Dr Raman's BSNL Sports Quiz is in the Limca Book of Records for being the longest running weekly quiz show on Indian television  Previously, he was the anchor of All Out for No Loss! on STAR Vijay

As a sports commentator, he has hosted over 2000 sports programs, including the Asia Cup Hockey Tournament (2007), the Twenty20 Cricket World Cup in Tamil for ESPN Star Sports (2007), and the  World Team Squash Championships (2007). He also provided commentary for the Squash World Cup of 2011  He frequently appears as a featured sports analyst on Puthiya Thalaimurai, Dinathanthi etc.,

Aside from Sports, he also does live coverage of current affairs. In 2009, he was involved with the analyses and debate over the Lok Sabha Polls for Zee Tamil, the Tamil Nadu Assembly Elections 2011 on DD Podhigai, Pre Poll Debates and Analysis on Zee Tamil in 2011 and election-day live coverage on DD Podhigai. He has hosted political debate shows, including Makkal Theerpu and Nattu Nadappu (both for Win TV) and Tamizha Tamizha on STAR Vijay.

He frequents as a political analyst and guest speaker for Headlines Today, NewsX, Republic and Times Now.

As a documentary filmmaker, he has been involved with the making of over 200 television documentaries, including "Power of the Ballot" in 1996, for which he won a National Award for Best Anchor, awarded by the UGC. He was also the winner of the Sony-ICD Video Award for the best film in the South and South East Asian category for These Leaves Never Wither

He has also been a senior anchor at State functions. Since 1993, he has been compering the State Independence Day and Republic Day celebrations in Chennai. In 2012, he also anchored the Diamond Jubilee celebrations of the Tamil Nadu State Legislative Assembly and the Sesquicentennial Celebrations of the Madras High Court. He has also compered the Inaugural Function of the World Tamil Conference in 2010 and the '100 Years of Indian Cinema' state celebrations in 2013.

He is a regular contributor to print media, and his work appears in The Economic Times, India Today and The Hindu

In 2019, Dr Raman announced that he was kicked out from hosting BSNL Sports Quiz anymore due to his political views being 'unpalatable to a certain political party. Sumanth wrote, “Over the last 3-4 years there have been multiple and repeated attempts made by those affiliated to or supporters of the BJP to oust me from the program because of me airing my political views on national and regional channels.”

Notable Media Appearances

References

Television personalities from Tamil Nadu
Living people
Indian game show hosts
Indian paediatricians
Madras Medical College alumni
Doordarshan journalists
20th-century Indian medical doctors
20th-century Indian journalists
Indian male journalists
Indian sports journalists
Year of birth missing (living people)